Q62 may refer to:
 Q62 (New York City bus)
 Al-Jumu'ah, a surah of the Quran
 , an auxiliary ship of the Argentine Navy